Josiah Wood (18 April 1843 – 13 May 1927) was a Canadian lawyer, entrepreneur, mayor, parliamentarian, and the 13th Lieutenant Governor of the province of New Brunswick.  He was born in Sackville, New Brunswick in 1843.

Personal life
He was the son of Mariner Wood and his wife Louisa Trueman of Point de Bute. On 14 January 1874, Wood married Laura S. Trueman of Sackville. He died on 13 May 1927 in Sackville, New Brunswick.

Education
After attending public school in Sackville, he entered Mount Allison Academy; later he became a member of the first graduating class of the newly founded university, then known as Mount Allison Wesleyan College. In 1866 he was awarded a Master of Arts degree with admission to the Bar of New Brunswick occurring later in the year.

Career
He entered the family business and built Mariner Wood & Sons into a company involved in retail, wholesale, shipbuilding, shipping, farming and lumbering, banking, real estate, including a large farm in Midgic plus the Wood Block in downtown Sackville. To this was later added investments in a variety of enterprises in Moncton.

Political offices held 
As a Conservative, he served three terms as a Member of Parliament in the House of Commons of Canada, representing the New Brunswick riding of Westmorland, winning the seat in the elections of 1882, 1887 and 1891.
On 5 August 1895, he was appointed to the Senate of Canada on the recommendation of Prime Minister Mackenzie Bowell. He resigned from the Senate on 12 March 1912 after being appointed Lieutenant Governor of New Brunswick.
On 12 February 1903, he became the first mayor of the newly incorporated town of Sackville, New Brunswick.
On 6 March 1912 he was appointed Lieutenant Governor of New Brunswick, a position he held until 1917.

Electoral record

References 
 
 

1843 births
1927 deaths
Lawyers in New Brunswick
Conservative Party of Canada (1867–1942) MPs
Canadian senators from New Brunswick
Lieutenant Governors of New Brunswick
Members of the House of Commons of Canada from New Brunswick
Mayors of places in New Brunswick
People from Sackville, New Brunswick